Dekha Ek Khwaab (English: Saw A Dream) was an Indian soap opera that aired on Sony Entertainment Television India and Sony Entertainment Television Asia. The series premiered on 21 November 2011 and went off air on 2 August 2012.

It is the story of Monia
a young girl who makes a wish to become a princess and how she deals with the realisation that she actually is one.  Her wish comes true overnight as she discovers that she is the long lost princess of the Devgarh Royals.

Plot
The series revolves around a 19 year-old girl named Monia, who discovers that she is Rajkumari Manyata, the crown princess of Devgarh. Manyata was kidnapped at the age of 3, and had been living with Murari Lal, a poor watchman who kidnapped her in order to take revenge from her father, Maharaj Brijraj, when the latter killed Murari's wife and children in an accident.

After sixteen years, Murari takes Manyata to Mumbai and she found returned to her family. Meanwhile, Manyata falls in love with Akash, a commoner. Yuvraj Udayveer Singh of Jaigarh (Uday), to whom Manyata was engaged as a child, befriends her but is upset to find out about Akash as he too has fallen in love with Manyata. Manyata's younger sister, Jainandini, has been in love with Uday since childhood and resents Manyata. A frustrated Uday calls Akash to meet him where they end up fighting and Akash falls over a cliff. Jainandini records the incident on her cell phone and starts blackmailing Uday.

Thinking Akash has gone missing, Manyata decides to become the perfect princess. The royal priest arranges three exams to see who between Manyata and Jainandini should be the heir. Jainandini creates many obstacles for Manyata and orchestrates multiple attempts to kill her but Manyata survives and is declared the 21st heiress or Yuvrani of Devgarh.
                                                      
After her coronation, Uday proposes to Manyata. Manyata finds out about Akash's fall and gets Uday arrested. Uday gets out on bail and informs Manyata about a contract between Rajmata and Uday's father, Maharaj Girijaraj, which states that the heiress of Devgarh must marry the heir of Jaigarh otherwise Devgarh would belong to Uday's family. A revengeful Jainandini causes Rajmata to meet with an accident landing her in a coma.

Jainandini's ex-fiance, Jagat Singh Rathore returns and introduces her to his friend Aryan who turns out to be Akash. Akash now wants to destroy both royal families which leaves Manyata shocked. Given the challenges posed by Uday and his father, Manyata gives in and decides to marry Uday. She also realises her love for him and decides to meet Akash one last time. However, she is delayed and Jainandini tries to replace her during the wedding ceremony. Uday finds out and is angered by Manyata's betrayal. He calls off the wedding.

Uday hosts a party and Manyata gets upset seeing him dance with Jainandini. She finally professes her love to him and he reciprocates her feelings. However, Akash and Jainandini team up to create misunderstandings between them. Uday meets with an accident and Manyata prays for his recovery. Manyata is reassured of Uday's love when his lawyer tells her that Uday had already signed over Devgarh back to her. Uday learns of Manyata's prayers and devotion for him and they finally reunite.

Cast and characters

References

External links
Dekha Ek Khwaab official site on Sony TV India

Sony Entertainment Television original programming
Indian drama television series
Indian television soap operas
2011 Indian television series debuts
2012 Indian television series endings
Rose Audio Visuals